Evangelical Church may refer to:

In general
 Evangelicalism, especially those associated with the National Association of Evangelicals
 Lutheranism

Church denominations

 Armenian Evangelical Church
 Assyrian Evangelical Church
 Canada
 Evangelical Lutheran Church in Canada, the largest Lutheran denomination in Canada
 Evangelical Missionary Church (EMCC), of Canada, formed in 1993 from merger of Evangelical Church in Canada and Missionary Church of Canada
 Ethiopian Evangelical Church Mekane Yesus (EECMY), Ethiopia
 Evangelical Church in Germany, the largest Protestant denomination in Germany
 Evangelical Church of Czech Brethren
 Evangelical Church of the Dominican Republic
 Evangelical Church of Egypt (Synod of the Nile)
 St. Thomas Evangelical Church of India
 Evangelical Church of Romania
 Evangelical Church of West Africa
 Christian Evangelical Church of Romania
 Evangelical Church of the Augsburg Confession in Slovakia
 Fellowship of Independent Evangelical Churches (United Kingdom)
 United States
 Evangelical Association, founded by Jacob Albright and often referred to as the Evangelical Church, one of the historic predecessor bodies of the United Methodist Church. It merged with others in 1946 to become the Evangelical United Brethren Church.
 Evangelical United Brethren Church (1946–1968), merged into the United Methodist Church
 Evangelical United Brethren Association, an offshoot of the Church of the United Brethren in Christ, which existed from sometime after 1848 until 1864
 Evangelical Church of North America (ECNA), a Wesleyan denomination also known as the Evangelical Church
 Evangelical Synod of North America, founded in the mid-19th century and centered in the Midwest, usually referred to simply as the Evangelical Church, one of the historic predecessor bodies of the United Church of Christ
 Evangelical Free Church of America, formed in 1942
 Evangelical Lutheran Church in America, the largest Lutheran denomination in the US
 Evangelical Church in Zambia (ECZ), founded 1910, a product of the South Africa General Mission in Cape Town, South Africa (now part of Serving In Mission)

Individual churches
Evangelical Church (Chichica, Panama), in Chichica, Ngöbe-Buglé, Panama

See also
 Evangelical Reformed Church (disambiguation)